The Purple Line was the ceasefire line between Israel and Syria after the 1967 Six-Day War and serves as the de facto border between the two countries.

History
Syria gained independence from France in 1946 and on May 14, 1948, the British withdrew from Palestine as Israel declared its independence. Syrian forces participated in the 1948 Arab–Israeli War between Arab forces and the newly established State of Israel. In 1949, armistice agreements were signed and a provisional border between Syria and Israel was delineated (based on the 1923 international border; see San Remo conference). Syrian and Israeli forces clashed on numerous occasions in the spring of 1951. The hostilities, which stemmed from Syrian opposition to an Israeli drainage project in the demilitarized zone, ceased on May 15, after intercession by the United Nations Security Council.

In June 1967 after battling Syria, Jordan and Egypt in the Six-Day War, Israel captured the entire length of the Golan Heights including its principal city Quneitra. The resulting ceasefire line (dubbed the "Purple Line" as it was drawn on the UN's maps) was supervised by a series of positions and observation posts manned by observers of the United Nations Truce Supervision Organization and became the new effective border between Israel and Syria.

In a surprise attack consisting of a massive armored thrust, the Syrians crossed the Purple Line into the Golan Heights during the 1973 Yom Kippur War. After several days of very heavy fighting on the Golan they were pushed back deeper into Syria and Israel conquered further territory  inside Syria beyond the Purple Line by the time a ceasefire was reached. In the disengagements negotiations after the war, Israel and Syria agreed on May 31, 1974, to pull back their respective forces on the Golan Heights to the Purple Line. On the same day, a United Nations buffer zone was set up and the United Nations Disengagement Observer Force Zone (UNDOF) was established by the United Nations after the adoption of UN Security Council Resolution 350.

See also
 Agreement on Disengagement between Israel and Syria
 Blue Line (Lebanon)
 Green Line (Israel)
 Green Line (Lebanon)

References

Arab–Israeli conflict
Israel–Syria border
1967 in Israel
1967 in Syria